Indonesian Fleet Command is a naval combat force of the Indonesian Navy (TNI-AL), it was formed and inaugurated by the Commander of the National Armed Forces Gen. Andika Perkasa on 21 January 2022. The Fleet Command consists of three fleets, namely: 1st Fleet Command located in Tanjungpinang, 2nd Fleet Command located in Surabaya and 3rd Fleet Command located in Sorong. The Indonesian Fleet Command Headquarters is located on Jl Gunung Sahari No. 67 Central Jakarta, Jakarta.

History

The Indonesian fleet as a naval combat force, was essentially born and grew with the birth of the INAF in October 1945 - all on the basis of the naval units of the People's Security Agency. The Indonesian fleet has never been absent in efforts to uphold and defend the sovereignty of the Nation.

During the National Revolution, the young Indonesian National Armed Forces, thru the Navy, had succeeded in carrying out various sea operations, including breaking the Dutch naval blockade, cross-sea expeditions in the context of sending soldiers and NCOs to far-flung area  and igniting the spirit of struggle in various areas outside the islands of Java and Sumatra. The National Revolution proved to be the baptism of fire of the young naval branch and its then small fleet.

Guided Democracy - foundation 
After many fruitful years, the Navy's growing fleet of Western naval assets, now battle tested in the twin campaigns of 1958-60 against both Permesta and the Revolutionary Government of the Republic of Indonesia, needed to adapt to the changing times. Sukarno's Guided Democracy program, began 1959, now set upon an era of massive reforms in the Armed Forces, the Navy included.

Based on the Decree of the Chief of Staff of the Navy (Kasal) No. A.4/2/10 dated 14 September 1959, the organization of the Indonesian Navy National Fleet Command was established. On December 5, 1959, the Chief of Staff of the Indonesian Navy, Commodore R.E. Martadinata, was present in the ceremony formalizing the establishment of the Indonesian Fleet Command Command Organization. The formation of the Fleet is a very important event in spurring the realization of a strong modern Indonesian Navy. Looking at the inauguration in 1959, as the momentum for modernizing the strength of the Navy that has been achieved and the strength of the Navy has fulfilled all the elements of strength as an Integrated Fleet Weapon System (SSAT) consisting of surface vessels, submarines, naval aircraft, landing forces of Marines and amphibious craft, and naval base elements.

These elements, reinforced by a steady supply of Soviet and Warsaw Pact materiel to the Navy, enabled the National Fleet to engage as the main maritime element of Operation Trikora and the Indonesia-Malaysia confrontation in the 1960s.

In 1961 the Military Sealift Command was created as a separate organization on the basis of the heavy landing and amphibious assets of the Fleet.

Decree of the Chief of Staff of the Navy No. 5401.7 dated February 18, 1963 concerning the Organization of the Ministry of the Navy under the Coordinating Ministry of Defense and Security, stated that in the context of consolidating and perfecting the organization of the Navy at large, it was necessary to make any organizational changes. The Indonesian Fleet Command Organization based on the Decree of the Chief of Staff/Minister of the Navy No. 5401.35 dated 6 August 1963 felt the need to be reorganized in order to adjust to the development of conditions and administrative and operational needs. For the implementation of the reorganization of the Fleet Command, the Commander's instructions were issued via telegram No. 170256/July 1963 regarding the implementation of the reorganization of the Indonesian Fleet Command.

As a continuation of the telegram, the Decree of the Minister of the Navy/Chief of Staff NO. 5401.48 dated December 1, 1963 regarding the National Fleet Command (Koarma RI). It was envisioned to be a functional and administrative Principal Combatant Command (Kotama) which is a directly reporting unit under the supervision of the office of the Vice Chief of Staff/Deputy Minister of the Navy. The main task of the Koarma is to organize administrative commands and coordinate the fleet component formations (Komando Jenis Koarma, Konjen) in order to prepare the combat readiness of each type of unit and to organize the Operational Command for the Fleet Ready Reserves Command (Koarsa) in order to enhance and maintain the combat operational readiness of the naval reserve fleet and its assigned vessels. This was to help prepare for any naval operation as may be ordered by Navy Headquarters at home or overseas.

Era of the New Order

On December 5, 1966, Koarma was split into two: the Ocean Fleet Forces Command (Koarsam) and Archipelago Fleet (Koartar). Koarsam is the Strategic Force of the Indonesian Navy in supporting the primary missions of the navy and the larger National Armed Forces, while Koartar is a regional force whose task is territorial defense against internal aggression and assistance in national security at home. Then based on KSAL Instruction No. 5401.15 of 1970 dated March 11, 1970, the two fleet commands were merged again to the Indonesian Fleet. In carrying out their duties, on the basis of the two commands the Indonesian Fleet was split into two - West Squadron (Eskabar) and the East Squadron (Eskatim).

In 1979 the two Squadrons, due to the retirement of older vessels and those of Warsaw Pact manufacture as well as the slow arrival of new Western-made naval craft, were merged into the National Fleet and its operational force, the Nusantara Fleet. Then based on the Decrree of the Commander of the Armed Forces Number Kep/09/P/III/1984 concerning the Principles of Organization and Procedures of the Indonesian Navy, the Indonesian Fleet was divided accordingly once more into two fleet commands, the Western Fleet Command (Koarmabar) and the Eastern Fleet Command (Koarmatim). This is a follow-up to the enactment of Law No. 20 of 1982 concerning the Basics of National Defense, where the functional tasks between the Ministry of Defense and Security and Armed Forces of the Republic were split. The renewed division of the fleet was made possible by an increased defense budget in the 80s, enabling the Navy to acquire more modern naval assets and equipment from the West while supporting a now growing local defense industry.

Based on the decree no. Skep/4033/XI/1987 dated November 17, 1987, the Navy formally set the birthday of the Indonesian Fleet as December 5, 1959, and hereinafter that day would be annually marked as the Naval Fleet Day of the Republic of Indonesia.

In 2018, the Fleets were renumbered the 1st and 2nd Fleets, and the 3rd Fleet was established. The three fleets were to serve in regional lines, assisting in maritime defense of western, central, and eastern Indonesia, respectively.

Reformation in the 21st Century 
In 2018-19, the Navy, following in the footsteps of other global naval forces, created the Fleet Marine Force (Satuan Marinir Komando Armada) to serve as the expeditionary oceangoing force of the Marine Corps and to help the Navy prepare for force projection and expeditionary combat operations abroad.

After 37 years, the presidency of Joko Widodo, thru the office of Minister of Defense Prabowo Subianto, mandated the Navy to officially reactivate the Indonesian National Fleet Forces, this time, as a principal Operational Command operationally responsible for national maritime security and defense operations and contributing overseas peacekeeping and with administrative control over the regional Fleets.

Vice Admiral INAF Dr. Agung Prasetiawan, M.A.P. was inaugurated as the first Commander of the reactivated Indonesian Fleet Command, at the 1st Fleet Command Docks at Pondok Dayung, Tanjung Priok, on Thursday, 3 February 2022 in a public ceremony presided by the Chief of Staff of the Navy, Admiral Yudo Margono.  On that day, the renewed colour of the Navy Fleet Command, which has the motto Ekapada Banda Jala Nusa which means Uniting the Powers of the Archipelagic Seas, was presented in the ceremony, symbolizing the rebirth of the Indonesian National Fleet.

Territorial history 
In 1985, the division of the National Fleet Command also led to the then Naval Regions (Komando Daerah Angkatan Laut, Kodaeral) being now directly reporting units of the Fleets - as Main Naval Bases (MNB, PUAL), and Naval Bases (NBs, PAL).

Before the reorganization, the Naval Regions, created in 1950 as Maritime Regions (Komando Daerah Maritim) were responsible under the office of the Chief of Staff of the Navy to administer maritime defense affairs along regional lines, acting as equivalent to the US Naval Regions. These naval regions, as a general rule following Japanese precedence, had regional patrol fleets under their direct supervision with the National Fleet supervising any major surface combatants or submarines forward deployed within the regions, a practice that continues on the MNBs till today.

Following the reorganization, the Western and Eastern Fleets were organized territorially into:

 under the Western Fleet:
 Main Naval Base I Belawan (Northern Sumatra Mainland and Maritime)
 created on the basis of the 1st Naval Region Northern Sumatra and 2nd Naval Region Southern Sumatra
 Main Naval Base II North Jakarta (Southern Sumatra, Western Kalimantan and Western Java)
 created on the basis of the 3rd Naval Region Western Java and parts of the 5th Naval Region Borneo and 2nd Naval Region Southern Sumatra
 under the Eastern Fleet:
 Main Naval Base III Surabaya (Eastern Java and Eastern Kalimantan)
 created on the basis of the 4th Naval Region Eastern Java and parts of the 5th Naval Region Borneo
 Main Naval Base IV Bitung (Sulawesi, Bali and Lesser Sundas)
 created on the basis of the 6th and 7th Naval Regions (Northern and Southern Celebes) and the 8th Naval Region Lesser Sundas
 Main Naval Base V Jayapura (Maluku and Papua)
 created on the basis of the 9th Naval Region Maluku Islands and 10th Naval Region Papua

Each MNB was organized in like manner with naval bases, air stations and maintenance shipyards under base commanders. The Naval Bases - formerly Naval Station Commands (NSCs, Kosetal/Kosionudal (Komando Station Angkatan Laut)) - have had served as regional bases in support of operations of the Fleets and the wider mission of the Navy over the decades.

Organization

Fleet Commands
The force is divided into 3 Fleet Commands namely, (1st Fleet Command) in Tanjungpinang, Riau Islands, (2nd Fleet Command) in Surabaya, East Java and (3rd Fleet Command) in Sorong, West Papua, each led by a Fleet Commander with the rank of two-star admiral (Rear Admiral).

Main Naval Bases 
Under the Main Naval Base framework are the following subordinated institutions that report to the MNB commander, a flag officer holding the rank of Commodore or Brigadier General (Marine Corps):

 Naval Bases (Type B), commanded by a Colonel (Navy / Marine Corps)
 Naval Bases (Type C), commanded by a Lieutenant Colonel (Navy / Marine Corps)
 Naval Bases (Type D), commanded by a Major (Navy / Marine Corps)
 Naval Stations
 Naval Stations Type A, commanded by a Captain (Navy / Marine Corps)
 Naval Stations Type B, commanded by a First Lieutenant (Navy / Marine Corps)
 Naval Stations Type C, commanded by a Second Lieutenant (Navy / Marine Corps)
 Naval Maintenance and Repair Facilities, with similar organization as in regular naval bases
 Naval Air Stations, with similar organization as in regular naval bases, but report to the Naval Aviation Center

The Main Naval Base organization additionally contains a naval security unit and an administrative regiment of one naval police battalion and one Marine Corps base defense battalion. This is in addition to a naval regional patrol flotilla which is responsible to the MNB commander.

Naval Bases are organized territorially into

 Naval Outposts
 Naval Security Outposts

Administrative and Operational organization 
Each subordinate fleet is organized into regional flottilas that operationally report to the nominal fleet group during contingencies.

See also
Naval warfare
Indonesian Marine Corps
Military Sealift Command (Indonesia)

References

External links
 Indonesian Fleet Command official website

Indonesian Navy
Military units and formations established in 1945
Naval fleets